Alois Würfmannsdobler is a West German former slalom canoeist who competed in the 1950s. He won a gold medal in the folding K-1 team event at the 1955 ICF Canoe Slalom World Championships in Tacen.

References

External links 
 Alois WÜRFMANNSDOBLER at CanoeSlalom.net

German male canoeists
Possibly living people
Year of birth missing (living people)
Medalists at the ICF Canoe Slalom World Championships